Belonophago is a small genus of distichodontid freshwater fish found in Middle Africa. They are specialized fin-eaters.

Species
The currently recognized species are:

 Belonophago hutsebouti Giltay, 1929
 Belonophago tinanti Poll, 1939

References

Distichodontidae
Fish of Africa